Woodville is an unincorporated community in Chester County, Tennessee.

Geography
The community is situated on Tennessee State Route 225.

History

Woodville is a community located along Tennessee State Route 225 and was originally part of McNairy County, but became part of Chester County when that county was formed. During the Civil War sentiment was divided in this area, as with other parts of Tennessee, between the Union and Confederacy. Fielding Hurst formed a Union Cavalry Regiment from people in this area. This area has been referred to by some historians as The Hurst Nation.

References 

Chester County Tennessee History and Families 1882 - 1995, Copyright 1995 Chester County Historical Society

Unincorporated communities in Chester County, Tennessee
Unincorporated communities in Tennessee
Jackson metropolitan area, Tennessee